Aygül Özkan (born 27 August 1971, in Hamburg) is a German politician of the Christian Democratic Union (CDU). She has been a member of the CDU since 2004, and was Minister of Social Affairs, Women, Families, Health and Integration in the state of Lower Saxony, in the Second Cabinet Wulff and the Cabinet McAllister between 2010 and 2013. She was the first ever German politician of Turkish descent and a Muslim serving as minister.

Personal life
Özkan's father migrated from Ankara (Turkey) to Hamburg (West Germany) in the 1960s, where he first worked for Deutsche Bundespost and subsequently set up an independent business as a tailor in Hamburg.

Özkan became a German citizen when she was 18 years old. She went on to study law at the University of Hamburg and became an attorney-at-law in 1998. She has a son.

Career
Özkan entered politics in the CDU in 2004, and was appointed State Minister of Social Affairs, Women, Family, Health, and Integration in the state of Lower Saxony, serving in the cabinets of successive Ministers-President Christian Wulff and David McAllister from 27 April 2010 to 19 February 2013.

In the negotiations to form a coalition government of the Christian Democrats (CDU together with the Bavarian CSU) and the Free Democratic Party (FDP) following the 2013 national elections, she was part of the CDU/CSU delegation in the working group on integration and migration, led by Maria Böhmer and Aydan Özoğuz. She caused some controversies in the German political establishment as she advocated a strictly secular policy and opposed the christian cross as well as the muslim headscarf in the schools.  

In a press release, Özkan announced her retirement from politics from 22 July 2014. She took a post as general manager of the DB Credit Service GmbH in Berlin, a subsidiary of Deutsche Bank, on 1 August 2014. She worked for Deutsche Telekom and the Dutch TNT Express before she entered politics. In 2018 she was announced as the CDU candidate for the mayorships elections in 2020. But she declined to run in the elections due to a serious illness.

Other activities
 Haus Rissen, member of the board of trustees
 Konrad Adenauer Foundation (KAS), Member of the Board of Trustees

References

External links 

 Official website
 Niedersächsisches Ministerium für Soziales, Frauen, Familie, Gesundheit und Integration / Biographie der Ministerin / Fotos

1971 births
Living people
Politicians from Hamburg
University of Hamburg alumni
Ministers of the Lower Saxony State Government
Christian Democratic Union of Germany politicians
Jurists from Hamburg
German politicians of Turkish descent
21st-century German businesswomen
21st-century German businesspeople
Women ministers of State Governments in Germany
21st-century German women politicians